Purple Lamp GmbH (formerly Purple Lamp Studios) is an Austrian video game developer based in Vienna. It was founded as an independent company in 2018 by employees from Sproing Interactive after Sproing filed for insolvency in 2016 and closed down in 2017. They had also acquired the rights to the Sproing brand and certain games previously made by them, and kept the games active by operating a subdivision under the name Sproing Publishing. 

In November 2020, the company was acquired by Embracer Group, and was placed under THQ Nordic as the parent company.

History

Games developed

Cancelled 
 MisBits (after early access period)

References 

Video game companies of Austria
Video game companies established in 2018
Video game development companies
Companies based in Vienna
Austrian companies established in 2018
THQ Nordic divisions and subsidiaries
2020 mergers and acquisitions